Robert Louis Hall (December 22, 1923 – March 12, 1983) was a pitcher in Major League Baseball who played from 1949 through 1953 for the Boston Braves (1949–50) and Pittsburgh Pirates (1953). He was born in Swissvale, Pennsylvania. 
 
In a three-season career, Hall posted a 9–18 record with a 5.40 ERA in 89 appearances, including 27 starts, one shutout, eight complete games and one save, giving up 182 runs (16 unearned) on 307 hits and 146 walks while striking out 133 in 276 innings of work.

References

External links
 or Retrosheet

1923 births
1983 deaths
People from Swissvale, Pennsylvania
Boston Braves players
Pittsburgh Pirates players
Major League Baseball pitchers
Baseball players from Pennsylvania
Winston-Salem Twins players
Williamsport Grays players
Buffalo Bisons (minor league) players
Vancouver Capilanos players
Seattle Rainiers players
Hollywood Stars players
Portland Beavers players
San Diego Padres (minor league) players